BER Airport – Terminal 1-2 station is a railway station located under the main terminal of Berlin Brandenburg Airport, Germany serving its Terminals 1 and 2 while the older BER Airport – Terminal 5 station serves its Terminal 5. Most train services are operated by Deutsche Bahn, which provides long-distance and regional connections while S-Bahn Berlin offers suburban lines.

Overview
The station is located in a  tunnel, on the Glasower Damm Ost–Bohnsdorf Süd railway and the Grünauer Kreuz–Berlin Brandenburg Airport railway, both of which branch off the Berlin–Görlitz railway; the Glasower Damm Ost–Bohnsdorf Süd railway also branched off the Berlin outer ring.  It is in the municipal territory of Schönefeld, just outside Berlin.

History
Construction of the station began in 2007 and the construction of the tunnels was completed on 25 June 2009. The station was handed over to Deutsche Bahn on 30 March 2010 and has been electrified since 7 June 2011. The public clients agreed to pay a fixed price of 285 million euros, although the actual construction cost was well below that number.  While the airport itself was not in operation, empty trains were running through the tunnels to drive out humidity. DB ultimately sued the airport for damages due to the unused station. The station was opened for regular passenger traffic on 26 October 2020, a few days before opening of the airport.

The station is served by Berlin S-Bahn, Regional-Express and InterCity services. The station lies directly under the airport terminal and has six platforms. Two of these are terminating platforms for the S-Bahn lines S45 and S9. The Airport is connected with Berlin Hauptbahnhof (Berlin main station) by the RE 9 Airport Express, with a journey time of 29 minutes as well as slower regional and suburban connections. Upgrades on the Berlin Dresden railway will enable faster and more frequent RE and IC service some time in the 2020s.

Train services
The station is served by the following regular service(s):

Intercity services  Dresden – Berlin Brandenburg Airport – Berlin – Rostock – Warnemünde (every 2 hours)
Regional services  Berlin Hauptbahnhof – Berlin Gesundbrunnen – Berlin Ostkreuz – Berlin Brandenburg Airport
Regional services  Dessau – Bad Belzig – Michendorf – Berlin – Berlin Brandenburg Airport – Wünsdorf-Waldstadt
Local services  (Berlin Friedrichstraße –) Potsdam – Golm – Saarmund – Berlin Brandenburg Airport - Königs Wusterhausen
S-Bahn services  Berlin Brandenburg Airport – Schöneweide – Neukölln – Südkreuz
S-Bahn services  Berlin Brandenburg Airport – Schöneweide – Ostbahnhof – Alexanderplatz – Hauptbahnhof – Westkreuz – Spandau''

Gallery

See also
Airport rail link
List of railway stations in the Berlin area

References

External links

Railway stations in Brandenburg
Brandenburg Airport
Berlin S-Bahn stations
Buildings and structures in Dahme-Spreewald
Railway stations in Germany opened in 2020
Airport railway stations in Germany